Mengshanosaurus is an extinct genus of choristodere from the Early Cretaceous Meng-Yin Formation of China. The type and only known species is M. minimus, known from a juvenile skull, around 3.5 cm long. It was found to be the basalmost neochoristodere.

References 

Choristodera
Prehistoric reptile genera
Fossil taxa described in 2021